The Frøken Norge 2009 pageant was held in Lillestrøm, Norway on 28 March 2009. 12 finalists were competing for the two winner titles. Frøken Norge World was chosen by 75% audience votes and 25% judges' votes and represented Norway in Miss World 2009 in South Africa, and the Frøken Norge Universe was chosen by the judges and represented Norway in Miss Universe 2009 in the Bahamas.

Final results

Judges
Pia Haraldsen (TV personality)
Hanne-Karine Sørby Nilsen (Miss Norway Universe 2003)
Natalia Davadi (winner of The Bachelor Norway 2008)
Tom André Tveitan (winner of the reality series Robinsonekspedisjonen)
Camilla Pihl (editor of Froken.no)

Among others.

Notes
Martine Dønheim (Ålesund) and Trine Dønheim (Ålesund) are twins.

References

Miss Norway
2009 beauty pageants
2009 in Norway